The Mescaleros were the British backing band for British singer, musician and songwriter Joe Strummer, formed in 1999, which issued three albums prior to Strummer's death in 2002.

Many of the band members were multi-instrumentalists. The original line up consisted of Strummer on vocals and guitar, Antony Genn on guitar, Scott Shields on bass, guitar and drums, Martin Slattery on keyboards and guitar, as well as flute and saxophone on select songs, Pablo Cook on various percussion instruments and Steve Barnard on drums, using his stage moniker "Smiley". Richard Flack was also employed to use effects and instruments.

The Mescaleros rose out of Strummer's work with Pablo Cook and Richard Norris.  The three of them originally came together to write the soundtracks for two short films, Tunnel of Love, and Question of Honour.  The song "Yalla Yalla" was originally written by this trio, and mixed by Antony Genn.  Once Genn was brought on board, a new song "Techno D-Day" was recorded, at which point Strummer, at the behest of Genn, began recording a new record.

The original drummer, Ged Lynch, left the band before recording on Rock Art & the X-Ray Style was complete and Smiley (Robbie Williams' former drummer) was brought in to finish recording.  Shields and Slattery were recruited through a number of contacts with the band.  Slattery had also appeared on Robbie Williams' Life Thru a Lens album, and Scott Shields was a friend of Slattery's.  Oddly enough, in the initial lineup, only Smiley was playing the instrument which he knew best.

Genn reportedly did not have the ability to play sufficient lead guitar, hence Slattery was brought in.  He, however, was trained in horns and keyboards and was a multi-instrumentalist.  Strummer once joked that Slattery could play a hole in the windshield of the tour bus.  Shields had previously been a drummer but was recruited to play bass, and later guitar.

History
The Mescaleros' first gig was in Antony Genn's hometown of Sheffield at The Leadmill on 5 June 1999. They toured extensively for the next six months, including playing the Glastonbury Festival, the U.S. and Europe. 2000 saw the band play Big Day Out in Australia and New Zealand, as well as touring Japan.

The band signed with the Californian punk label Hellcat Records, and issued three albums. Following the release of the first, Rock Art and the X-Ray Style, they toured England and North America; sets included several Clash-fan favourites.

Singer-songwriter Tymon Dogg, a longtime friend of Joe Strummer, joined the band in 2000 playing violin and Spanish guitar. He contributed some of the tunes on Global A Go-Go, including "Mondo Bongo".

Honorary Mescaleros include John Blackburn and Jimmy Hogarth, both of whom played bass in place of Scott Shields on the 2000 tour supporting The Who, which was also Tymon Dogg's first tour with the band. Andy Boo, Srummer's guitar tech also appeared in the Mescaleros line up in place of Pablo Cook on percussion at a gig in Finland 1999.

Following the departure of Genn and Smiley, Scott Shields moved to guitar, Simon Stafford was brought on board to play bass, and Luke Bullen was recruited to play drums. Pablo Cook left in August 2001 to join Moby.

Following the release of Global a Go-Go, Joe Strummer and the Mescaleros mounted a 21-date tour of North America, Britain, and Ireland. Once again, these concerts featured Clash material ("London Calling", "Rudie Can't Fail"), as well as classic covers of reggae hits ("The Harder They Come", "A Message to You, Rudy") and regularly closed the show with a nod to Joey Ramone by playing The Ramones' "Blitzkrieg Bop".

Musically, the Mescaleros continued the genre mixing that Strummer was known for during his time with The Clash. Elements of reggae, jazz, funk, hip hop, country, and of course punk rock can be found in the three Mescaleros releases.

The band is also the subject of a documentary by Dick Rude titled Let's Rock Again! which was released on 27 June 2006. The band also appear on many DVDs (see full list below) and have had several of their songs appear in major films such as Black Hawk Down and Mr. & Mrs. Smith. One song, "Johnny Appleseed," was used as the theme song to the HBO series John From Cincinnati.

Joe Strummer & the Mescaleros' last concert was on 22 November 2002, in Liverpool.  This show is often overlooked however, in favor of citing the 15 November show at Acton Town Hall.  It was this show, which was a benefit for striking fire fighters, that Mick Jones joined Strummer on stage for the first time in nearly twenty years, during the Clash song "Bankrobber."  An encore followed with both "White Riot" and "London's Burning".  The Last Night London Burned, a 64-page book written by George Binette, showing never before published pictures of Joe Strummer and Mick Jones, and a 26-minute film by Gregg McDonald and Alan Miles, were released as a unique visual record of that last London concert by Joe Strummer & the Mescaleros. Following the conclusion of this tour, the band headed straight for the studio, but Strummer died of a congenital heart defect on 22 December 2002 after returning home from walking his dogs.

The band's final album Streetcore was released, after Strumer's death, on 20 October 2003.

The band also made appearances on the Late Show with David Letterman, Late Night with Conan O'Brien, as well as touring on the Hootenany Festival in the summer of 2001.

Various Mescaleros members have performed at numerous tribute concerts in both UK & Europe. Pablo Cook & Smiley together with Mike Peters (the Alarm), Derek Forbes (Simple Minds), Steve Harris (Gary Numan) are members of Los Mondo Bongo, a celebration of the music of Joe Strummer, who together with Ray Gange (DJ) tour whenever possible, performing Mescaleros tunes.

Antony Genn currently fronts The Hours, a band that he and fellow Mescalero Martin Slattery formed in 2004.

In an October 2013 interview with BBC 6 Music, Mick Jones confirmed that in the months prior to Strummer's death, the two were writing new music together. At the time, Jones assumed the new songs would be on an upcoming Mescaleros album. But months later he ran into Strummer at an event, and Strummer informed him that the music was intended for a new Clash album.

Members
 Joe Strummer – lead vocals, rhythm guitar
 Martin Slattery – lead guitar, keyboards, saxophone, flute
 Scott Shields – guitar, bass guitar
 Antony Genn – guitar (1999–2000)
 Simon Stafford – bass guitar, trombone (2001–2002)
 Tymon Dogg – violin, Spanish guitar, keyboards (2000–2002)
 John Blackburn – bass guitar (2000)
 Jimmy Hogarth – bass guitar (2000)
 Pablo Cook – percussion (1999–2001)
 Luke Bullen – drums (2001–2002)
 Steve "Smiley" Barnard – drums (1999–2000)

Discography

 Studio albums

 Soundtracks, compilations, box sets and live albums

 Singles

Music videos

DVDs on which Joe Strummer & The Mescaleros appear:
Joe Strummer: The Future is Unwritten Directed by Julien Temple (out on DVD: September 2007)
Viva Joe Strummer Directed by M.Parkinson
Let's Rock Again! Directed by Dick Rude
Later with Jools Holland: Legends
Hootenanny DVD
Give 'Em the Boot
Glastonbury the Movie
Black Hawk Down (soundtrack)
Le scaphandre et le papillon ("The Diving Bell and the Butterfly") (2007)

Notes

References

Further reading

External links
 Home of The Mescaleros
 Festival of music and film to celebrate the work of Joe Strummer
 The Joe Strummer Foundation for New Music
 Richard Flack Music Production

English punk rock groups
English alternative rock groups
English post-punk music groups
English folk rock groups
Reggae rock groups
The Clash
Hellcat Records artists